Jump for Joy may refer to:

Jump for Joy (1941 revue), a musical by Duke Ellington
Jump for Joy (Cannonball Adderley album), 1958
Jump for Joy (Peggy Lee album), 1958
Jump for Joy (Bobby Short album), 1970
"Jump for Joy" (My Name Is Earl), a 2006 episode
"Jump for Joy" (song), a 1996 song by 2 Unlimited
"Jump for Joy", a 1975 song by the Biddu Orchestra

See also
Jumping for Joy, a 1956 British comedy film